Homosexual transsexual is a taxonomic category used in sexology, psychology, and psychiatry, to classify transgender or transsexual people who are attracted to members of the same biological sex. It classifies trans women attracted to men (and less often, trans men attracted to women), based on assigned sex at birth, rather than gender identity.

The concept of categorizing trans women by sexual orientation originated with Magnus Hirschfeld in 1923, and was further developed by the sexologist Harry Benjamin in 1966 as a component of the Benjamin scale. The specific term homosexual transsexual was coined by Kurt Freund in 1973, and used from 1982 onward by him and others.

In the DSM III, published in 1980, transsexualism was to be diagnosed and the sexual orientation of a transsexual specified using the terms homosexual, heterosexual, asexual, or unspecified. This convention had its origins in the taxonomic work of researchers like Hirschfeld, Benjamin, and Freund, which found that grouping trans women by sexual orientation revealed important qualitative and statistical differences between them. These differences have been maintained by various researchers as indicative or suggestive of multiple, distinct etiologies. The term homosexual transsexual has since been used in publications by a variety of academics, including Benjamin, Freund, Blanchard, and Anne Lawrence, as well as J. Michael Bailey and James Cantor, among others. Sexologist Ray Blanchard uses the concept in relation to one type of male-to-female (MTF) transsexual in his transsexualism typology developed in the late 1980s.

The term homosexual transsexual has been criticized by sexologists, linguists, and transgender activists as confusing and insensitive toward trans identities. Milton Diamond proposed the alternatives androphilic (attracted to men) and gynephilic (attracted to women) as neutral descriptors for sexual orientation that do not make assumptions about the sex or gender identity of the person being described. Terms such as androphilia and gynephilia are sometimes used instead of, or concurrently with, homosexual, heterosexual, or non-homosexual in current research, such as research which has used the Modified Androphilia Scale to assess the attraction to men of a given trans woman. S. J. Wahng contended in 2004 that the term homosexual transsexual is "archaic". Though the term transsexuality was removed as a mental disorder from the DSM-IV and was replaced with gender identity disorder as a diagnostic label, attraction to males, females, both, or neither was specified in the DSM IV-TR.

Most of the research on "homosexual transsexuality" has been conducted on trans women. They are usually socioeconomically disadvantaged, born later in a series of male siblings, are unlikely to display cross-gender fetishism or autogynephilia, and come out at a younger age than non-androphilic trans women. Relatively little research has been done on gender variance in assigned females, although the prevalence of female-to-male gender dysphoria is comparable to that of male-to-female GD.

Development of the concept
The term homosexual transsexual was defined by Kurt Freund in 1974, and was used by various sexologists and psychiatrists to describe trans women who are androphilic (attracted to men), though occasionally they used it to describe trans men who are gynephilic (attracted to women). The concept of a taxonomy based on transsexual sexuality was first proposed by physician Magnus Hirschfeld in 1922, and was codified by endocrinologist Harry Benjamin in the Benjamin Scale in 1966, which was published in the influential book The Transsexual Phenomenon. Benjamin wrote that researchers of his day thought that attraction to men while feeling that oneself is a woman was the factor that distinguished a transvestite from a transsexual. He wrote, "The transvestite—they say—is a man, feels himself to be one, is heterosexual, and merely wants to dress as a woman. The transsexual feels himself to be a woman ("trapped in a man’s body") and is attracted to men."

Homosexuality was removed as a mental disorder from the DSM-II, the diagnostic manual published by the American Psychiatric Association and one of the most influential diagnostic manuals worldwide. "Ego-dystonic homosexuality" was retained as a diagnosis for those who are caused distress by their sexual orientation; it wasn't until the DSM-5 (2013) that distress over one's sexual orientation was completely removed from the manual as a possible diagnosis.

In 1980 in the DSM-III, a new diagnosis was introduced, that of "302.5 Transsexualism" under "Other Psychosexual Disorders". This was an attempt to provide a diagnostic category for gender identity disorders; the others included were "302.3 Transvestism" and "302.8 Fetishism". The diagnostic category, "transsexualism", was for gender dysphoric individuals who demonstrated at least two years of continuous interest in transforming their physical and social gender status. The subtypes were 1. asexual, 2. homosexual (same anatomic sex), 3. heterosexual (other anatomic sex) and 0. unspecified.

Physician and sexologist Kurt Freund proposed two types of cross-gender identity in 1982, based on his observation that gender identity disorder is different for homosexual males and heterosexual males. Subsequently, this term appeared in the DSM-III-R, but not in the DSM-IV in which gender identity disorder replaced transsexualism. Sexologists may quantitatively measure sexual orientation using psychological personality tests or self reports. Blanchard and Freund used the Masculine Identity  in Females (MGI), and the Modified Androphilia Scale. Homosexual transsexuals averaged a Kinsey scale measurement of 5–6 or a 9.86 ± 2.37 on the Modified Androphilia Scale.

Terminological debate
The concept that trans people with different sexual orientations are etiologically different has a long history in this field.  However the terms used have not always been agreed on. Some scientists working on the topic have criticized the practice of categorizing transsexuals by sexual orientation and sex at birth. Benjamin argued that trans women can only be "homosexual" if anatomy alone is considered, and their psyches are ignored. According to him, after sex-reassignment surgery, calling a male-to-female transsexual "homosexual" is pedantic.  He opined that the question "is a transsexual homosexual?" had both "yes" and "no" answers depending on whether sexual anatomy or gender identity was prioritised, and that in cases of post-operative male-to-female transsexuals, describing them as "homosexual men" was against "reason and common sense". When Benjamin was writing, transsexual implied male-to-female, and attracted to men. For a time in the 1980s terms which SJ Wahng describes as homosexual transsexual were in the DSM-III-R (transsexual, homosexual subtype) The DSM-IV and DSM-IV-TR stipulated that the sex a transsexual is attracted to be specified as "attracted to males, females, both or neither".

Others, such as biologist and linguist Bruce Bagemihl, agree with what Benjamin wrote about the use of this term. Bagemihl wrote that this terminology makes it easy to say transsexuals are really homosexual males seeking to escape from stigma. Sexologist Jim Weinrich opined that sexologist Ray Blanchard had, due to "taxonomic zeal", used "a series of clever questionnaires and plethysmographic studies" to address this issue.  Weinrich said that Blanchard asserted all female-to-male transsexuals were "woman loving", but also said that Blanchard had admitted that this was "probably not true." Critics argue that the term "homosexual transsexual" is "heterosexist", "archaic", and demeaning because it labels people by sex assigned at birth instead of their gender identity. Frank Leavitt and Jack Berger state that the label seems to have little clinical merit, writing that homosexual transsexuals have "little in common with homosexuals, except a stated erotic interest in males". They suggest "more neutral descriptive terms such as androphilia". Benjamin, Leavitt, and Berger have all used the term in their own work. Sexologist John Bancroft also expressed regret for having used this terminology, which was standard when he used it, to refer to transsexual women. He says that he now tries to choose his words more sensitively.

Alternative terms
Professor of anatomy and reproductive biology Milton Diamond proposed the use of the terms androphilic and gynephilic as alternatives to homosexual and heterosexual. Diamond wrote that the terms homosexual and heterosexual are confusing as applied to transsexual persons because it is not instantly clear whether they reference the pre- or post-transition state. S.J. Wahng said in 2004 that the diagnosis homosexual transsexual is archaic and conflates homosexuality with transsexuality.

Sexological research has been done using these alternative terms by researchers such as Sandra L. Johnson. Both Blanchard and Leavitt used a psychological test called the "modified androphilia scale" to assess whether a transsexual was homosexual or not.

Transgender community reaction
According to Leavitt and Berger, the term is "both confusing and controversial among males seeking sex reassignment"; transsexuals assigned male at birth "vehemently oppose the label and its pejorative baggage." Transgender activist Andrea James has called the term "inaccurate and offensive," and sociologist Aaron Devor wrote, "If what we really mean to say is attracted to males, then say 'attracted to males' or androphilic ... I see absolutely no reason to continue with language that people find offensive when there is perfectly serviceable, in fact better, language that is not offensive."

Description

Androphilic trans women

Sexual activity
Building on work by Freund, Frank Leavitt and Jack C. Berger in 1990 further categorized androphilic trans women by three patterns of sexual activity in how they used their penis. In their study 44% were sexually inactive, 19% avoided use of the penis during sex, and 37% derived pleasure from using the penis during sex. The groups showed varying levels of masculinity and emotional disturbance in development. Leavitt and Berger found that transsexuals in the avoidant group are different from those in the other two groups. They fit the description of the "nuclear transsexual". They had a strong cross gender identification, wanted female anatomy, had never married and little to no sexual activity with females. Of all the subgroups this group had the least comorbid psychopathology. The transsexuals in the pleasure group behaved sexually in ways that were "classically homosexual". They were more likely than those in the avoidant group to have had sexual experience with females. They also rated higher on a test of general fetishism. Other than this, transsexuals in the pleasure group were similar to the description of a "nuclear transsexual". They found that transsexuals in the inactive group had characteristics which most differed from that of the "nuclear transsexual", such as strong heterosexual orientations (as determined from psychological testing), and fetish histories. "The pattern exhibited generally conforms to that exhibited by heterosexual transsexuals." The inactive group was found to share little with the other groups of transsexuals other than a stated sexual interest in males. Leavitt and Berger also mentioned studies by Blanchard which suggest that heterosexual transsexuals will adjust their life stories to ensure that they get sex reassignment surgery.

Socioeconomic factors
Researchers have recently found several demographic features that androphilic trans women tend to have in common. Ken Zucker in 2002 and Yolanda Smith et al. in 2005 independently found that androphilic trans women were lower in IQ, social class, and age than other trans women. They were, on average, in their mid-teens to mid-20s when they reported to a gender clinic for sex reassignment. They were more likely to be recent immigrants, have non-intact families, non-Caucasian race, and childhood behavior problems.

In 1984, D.F. MacFarlane studied transsexual people in Australia and New Zealand. MacFarlane found that 90% of the androphilic trans women prostitutes in New Zealand were Māori, an ethnic group who are only 9% of the overall population. MacFarlane concluded that culture influenced the number of Māori androphilic trans women he observed.

Fraternal birth order effect
Research on the causes of androphilia in trans women, transgender identity, and homosexuality overlap to a large degree. The etiology of transsexualism concerns the causes of transsexuality in general, including the theory that transsexualism is caused by differences in specific areas of the brain, while relationships between biology and sexual orientation have been studied in depth as possible causes of homosexuality.

Blanchard and Zucker came to the general conclusion that birth order has some influence over sexual orientation in assigned-male people in general, and androphilic trans women in specific. This phenomenon is called the "fraternal birth order effect". In 2000, Richard Green observed that androphilic trans women tended have a later-than-expected birth order, and more older brothers than other subgroups trans women. Each older brother increased the odds that a trans woman was androphilic by 40%. Green did not find a higher incidence of androphilia in the younger brothers of androphilic trans women.

Zucker and Blanchard wrote that studies have consistently supported the "fraternal birth order effect" that androphilic trans women have more brothers than sisters and are born later in birth order. In contrast, in their study using an Asian sample they found that the trans women had significantly more sisters than the control population. Zucker attributes this to the preference for males in Korean society causing parents to stop having children once they have a male child. Therefore, all male children are less likely to have older brothers and hence no fraternal birth order effect is observed.

Use in Blanchard's typology

Sexologist Ray Blanchard defined this category in his research, based on testing or self-report, and argued based on his research that self-report is not always reliable. Morgan, Blanchard, Lawrence, and other researchers have speculated that many reportedly "non-homosexual" trans women systematically distorted their life stories because "non-homosexuals" were often screened out as candidates for surgery, and because some saw "homosexual transsexual" as a more socially desirable diagnosis.

According to Blanchard, key characteristics of include conspicuous cross-gender behavior from childhood through adulthood, and an androphilic sexual orientation. Blanchard also claims that non-androphilic trans women (as well as all other non-androphilic males with gender dysphoria) have a condition called autogynephilia and are aroused by the idea or image of themselves as women.  Blanchard found in his studies that homosexual transsexuals were younger when applying for sex reassignment, reported a stronger cross-gender identity in childhood, had a more convincing cross-gender appearance, and functioned psychologically better than "non-homosexual" transsexuals. A lower percentage of the homosexual transsexuals reported being (or having been) married, as well as sexual arousal while cross-dressing. Studies have variously found that between 10% and 36% of homosexual transsexuals report a history of sexual arousal to cross dressing. Bentler found 23%, while Freund reported 31%.

Previous taxonomies, or systems of categorization, used the terms "classic transsexual" or "true transsexual," terms once used in differential diagnoses. Blanchard also said homosexual transsexuals were comparatively shorter and lighter in proportion to their height than non-homosexuals. Independent research done by Johnson and Smith concurs with most of Blanchard's observations. Smith did not find a significant difference in height-weight ratio. Subsequent research has found only partial support of Smith's findings. Johnson's 1990 work used the alternative term "androphilic transsexual", Johnson wrote that there was a correlation between social adjustment to the new gender role and androphilia.

Gynephilic trans men
In 2000, Meredith L. Chivers and Bailey wrote, "Transsexualism in genetic females has previously been thought to occur predominantly in homosexual (gynephilic) women." According to them, Blanchard reported in 1987 that only 1 in 72 trans men he saw at his clinic were primarily attracted to men. They observed that these individuals were so uncommon that some researchers thought that androphilic trans men did not exist, or misdiagnosed them as homosexual transsexuals, attracted to women. Relatively few studies have examined childhood gender variance in trans men.

In the 2005 study by Smith and van Goozen, their findings in regards to trans men were different from their findings for trans women. Smith and van Goozen's study included 52 female-to-male transsexuals, who were categorized as either homosexual or non-homosexual. Smith concluded that female-to-male transsexuals, regardless of sexual orientation, reported more GID symptoms in childhood, and a stronger sense of gender dysphoria.  Smith wrote that she found some differences between homosexual and non-homosexual female-to-male transsexuals. Smith says that non-homosexual female-to-males reported more gender dysphoria than any group in her study. Smith says, "It is of interest, though, that a few female-to-male transsexuals reported to have been sexually aroused in adolescence when dressing in male clothes, as this has never been reported before."

MRI studies and neurological differences
The concept that androphilia in trans women is related to homosexuality in cisgender men has been tested by MRI studies. These studies have been interpreted as supporting Blanchard's transsexualism typology. These studies show neurological differences between androphilic trans women and control subjects, as well as differences between androphilic and gynephilic trans women.  The same studies also showed differences between transsexual and nontranssexual people, leading to the conclusion that transsexuality is "a likely innate and immutable characteristic".

A 2013 study observed the brains of 10 androphilic trans women and 7 gynephilic trans men who reported to a gender clinic, and who had not had any hormonal treatments. The question the research wished to address was the existence of any differences between transgender and cisgender brains. Their stated reason for selecting "homosexual" trans subjects was to avoid clouding the issue with a sample of mixed sexual orientations, given Blanchard's typology. This study also controlled for possible influence of external hormones by looking at subjects who had not taken any yet. The study reported that the androphilic trans women studied did not differ significantly from the 11 cisgender female control subjects, but showed differing regional GM volume in several brain areas compared to the 7 cisgender male control subjects. Additionally, researchers found areas significant structural differences between transgender subjects and controls, independent of their assigned sexes.

See also
 Gynephilia and androphilia
 Transgender youth

References

Further reading

External links
 TransKids.us - Writings by Self-Identified "Homosexual Transsexuals"
 "Autogynephilia and the Taxonomy of Gender Identity Disorders in Biological Males" - Ray Blanchard, 2000

Homosexuality
Transgender sexuality
Transgender studies